The finals and the qualifying heats of the men's 200 metre individual medley event at the 1998 World Aquatics Championships were held on Saturday 1998-01-17 in Perth, Western Australia.

A Final

B Final

Qualifying heats

Remarks

See also
1996 Men's Olympic Games 200m Individual Medley (Atlanta)
1997 Men's World SC Championships 200m Individual Medley (Gothenburg)
1997 Men's European LC Championships 200m Individual Medley (Seville)
2000 Men's Olympic Games 200m Individual Medley (Sydney)

References

Swimming at the 1998 World Aquatics Championships